The Marshall Site (15CE27) is an Early Mississippian culture archaeological site located near Bardwell in Carlisle County, Kentucky, on a bluff spur overlooking the Mississippi River floodplain. The site was occupied from about 900 to about 1300 CE during the James Bayou Phase of the local chronology and was abandoned sometime during the succeeding Dorena Phase. Its inhabitants may have moved to the Turk Site, which is located on the nearest adjacent bluff spur to the south, and which was founded about this time. It is several miles south of the Wickliffe Mounds Site.

Site description
Marshall is a large village site, with evidence of once having had platform mounds and earthworks, although it is unclear from what time period these mounds would date. It is one of the few James Bayou Phase sites to be extensively excavated. Because it was abandoned. its archaeological features were undisturbed by later occupations.

In 1985, an archaeological team from the University of Illinois conducted excavations at Marshall, with some work being performed by the university's summer field school.  Four locations were excavated: spots on the eastern and western sides of the central knoll, another on a spur to the north, and a fourth at the bluff edge to the southwest of the center.  On the eastern side of the knoll, a substantial midden was investigated and found to possess good stratigraphy; a piece of charcoal from the midden was radiocarbon dated to c. 1027 CE.  On the western side of the knoll, excavations examined the remains of a house under a midden, finding Mississippian culture pottery tempered with mussel shells, while the excavation north of the knoll revealed the presence of numerous linear features interpreted as being the remains of several houses that were constructed on the site in sequence.  Little was found in the excavation site to the southwest of the knoll; the excavators tested a horseshoe-shaped earthwork but were able to establish virtually nothing aside from a conclusive determination that it was the site's southwestern corner.

See also 
 National Register of Historic Places listings in Carlisle County, Kentucky

References

External links
 Early shell tempering in far Western Kentucky

Mississippian culture
Archaeological sites on the National Register of Historic Places in Kentucky
Geography of Carlisle County, Kentucky
National Register of Historic Places in Carlisle County, Kentucky
Native American history of Kentucky